Mind Your Language is a British sitcom that premiered on ITV in 1977. It was produced by London Weekend Television and directed by Stuart Allen. Three series were made by London Weekend Television between 1977 and 1979, and it was briefly revived in 1985 (or 1986 in most ITV regions) with six of the original cast members. The series shows people of different countries with different social background, religions, and languages existing in the same classroom, learning English as a foreign language.

Summary
The show is set in an adult education college in London and focuses on the class in English as a Foreign Language directed by Mr Jeremy Brown, who teaches a group of enrolled foreigners.

Cast and characters

Series 1-3
 Barry Evans (42 episodes) as Jeremy Brown, the EFL teacher and focal point of most of the series. He is a good-natured, earnest single man in his thirties who lives alone (apart from his Siamese cat Josephine, whom he mentions in "The Examination"). He has a Bachelor of Arts from Oxford University. He was hired in the series pilot, in which he was warned that the students drove the previous teacher insane. Mr Brown is up to the challenge but often exasperated by the students' creative interpretations of the English language.
 George Camiller (42 episodes) as Giovanni Capello, a stereotypical Italian British Catholic chef, the class's loudspeaker and de facto class monitor. He is best friends with Max, who becomes his flatmate. Giovanni's main problem with English is understanding metaphors and large words, though he often answers wrongly on purpose to amuse the class. He often calls Mr Brown Professori. When shocked or surprised, he often catchphrases like "Santa Maria", "Santa Daisy", "Okey cokey", "Buona sera" or "Holy ravioli". When he doesn't understand something he says scusi. He has an elaborate set of first names: Giovanni Vincenzo Marco Dino Alberto Leonardo etc. His last name is sometimes spelled "Cupello" in the closing credits.
 Kevork Malikyan (29 episodes) as Maximillian Andrea Archimedes Papandrious (Series 1–3), stereotypical Greek Orthodox shipping-agency worker from Athens who is often paired with Giovanni. He is attracted to Danielle, but as the show progresses, the three become friends. Max tends to misunderstand metaphors and large words. He also has a heavy accent, which causes him to add h to the beginning of almost every word that starts with a vowel sound. Later, he shares his flat with Giovanni, with whom he is close friends; these two characters have the best command of the English language of all the students in the series.
 Robert Lee (29 episodes) as Tarō Nagazumi (Series 1–3), a Japanese electronics executive who works as a representative for the London branch of the fictional Japan-based electronic company, Bushido Electronics. He speaks English quite fluently, but has a habit of adding -o to almost every word he says (as in "thank-o," "England-o," and so on) and always replies "Ah so!" and bows whenever he is called on. Early in the series he is at odds with Su-Lee due to Japan and China's own political differences in the 1970s but they become friends later on. Most of the time he is seen with his camera.
 Jamila Massey (29 episodes) as Jamila Ranjha (Series 1–3), a stereotypical Indian housewife from Shimla. When she first joins the class she barely speaks any English - she rants in Hindi when Mr Brown asks her name, and when she finally does understand, she writes her name on the blackboard in Urdu because she cannot write it in English. Although she needs Ali to translate for her in Series 1, by Series 3 she shows a marked improvement and is able to communicate in English without needing any help. She often calls Mr Brown "Masterji" (Hindi roughly meaning "teacher" or "professor"), and her catchphrase early in the series is "gud hefening" (which is how she pronounces "good evening"). She often brings her knitting to class. She is shown to be a Christian in the episode "Guilty or Not Guilty", when she swears on the Bible to tell the truth. From "A Point of Honour" onward she wears a cross necklace, but in the same episode she suggests that Buddhism is the true religion when the students argue about it. Also, in the episode "I Belong to Glasgow", she crosses herself along with Jock, Danielle, Max and Giovanni.
 Pik-Sen Lim (27 episodes) as Chung Su-Lee (Series 1–3), a stereotypical Chinese communist woman who works as a secretary at the Chinese Embassy. She is never seen without her Little Red Book of Mao, from which she often quotes. She constantly mixes up her r and l sounds. Early in the series, she had a fierce ideological rivalry with Taro, her Japanese classmate, but later in the series, he often springs to her defence when a character insults her or China. When she quotes Chairman Mao, Mr Brown replies "That's a matter of opinion".
 Ricardo Montez (42 episodes) as Juan Cervantes, a Spanish Catholic bartender with an optimistic outlook. Juan is always laughing at himself, confident of his answers even when they are completely wrong. Early in the series, Juan speaks almost no English (apart from "An Inspector Calls", where he describes Miss Courtney as "Plenty awesome, very good!") and answers everything with "Por favor?" (please), necessitating Giovanni to translate some key terms for him (as Spanish and Italian have many mutually intelligible words). His typical catchphrase is "S'alright!" and sometimes when he is corrected he says "Sorry, wrong number." Juan's English improves as the series goes on, but he remains one of the worst speakers, often speaking a mix of English and Spanish. He cares a great deal for Mr Brown, whom he considers almost as part of his family.
 Albert Moses (42 episodes) as Ranjeet Singh, an Indian London Underground employee from Punjab and a religious Sikh. In the first episode, Mr Brown mistook him for a Pakistani when he asked him to sit next to his "fellow countryman", Ali Nadim. He has a good vocabulary but tends to mix up his general knowledge, and upon being corrected he always puts his hands together and says "a thousand apologies". When angered, he threatens his tormenters with his kirpan. He usually comes late to class. In "A Fate Worse Than Death", a woman named Surinder appeared at the school and he told everyone that they had been betrothed to each other as children, but he no longer wished to marry her. He often clashes with Ali, but they become friends in the later episodes.
 Dino Shafeek (29 episodes) as Ali Nadim (Series 1-3), a Muslim from Lahore, Pakistan. Religious and cultural differences often bring him into conflict with Ranjeet. He is one of the most honest and hardworking students in the class, which sometimes gets Mr Brown and him into trouble. He used to work at the Taj Mahal Tandoori Restaurant, but is unemployed at the beginning of the series and later gets a job as a travelling salesman. He is married, and his wife Rehana appears in "Better to Have Loved and Lost" and "What a Tangled Web"; in the latter episode, they have had a child.
 Françoise Pascal (29 episodes) as Danielle Favre (Series 1–3), an amorous young French Catholic au pair who instantly grabs the attention of all the men, including Mr Brown. Her good looks often distract Giovanni and Max from their answers, while Mr Brown is often found in seemingly incriminating positions with her, and she is strongly attracted to him. She is annoyed when Ingrid joins the class, instigating a rivalry for Mr Brown's attention.
 Jacki Harding (42 episodes) as Anna Schmidt, a stereotypical West German who works as an au pair. In her introduction, she refers to "German efficiency"; accordingly, she's a hardworking student, occasionally asking legitimate questions, and as the series progresses, answering Mr Brown's questions correctly. Her main problem is mixing v and w sounds. She also punctuates her sentences with German words. She is shown to have exceptional physical strength and she is never reluctant to show it, often punching fellow students (such as Max) if they try to flirt with her. In one episode, she says that Lutheranism was the true religion while the students are having an argument, but in the episode "How's Your Father" she says that there's no life after death.
 Anna Bergman (21 episodes) as Ingrid Svenson (Series 2, 4), a Swedish au pair who joins the class at the beginning of Series 2. She is attractive and straightforward about her attraction to Mr Brown, sparking a rivalry between her and Danielle Favre. Her main problem with English is word order, often getting words mixed up, such as "you for I question answer". She transfers schools at the end of Series 2, but returns in the independently produced Series 4.
 Zara Nutley (42 episodes) as Dolores Courtney, the stuffy, imperious principal of the school. Miss Courtney has a great dislike of the male gender, thinks women are superior to men, and prefers female teachers. She hesitates to hire Mr Brown, but reluctantly puts him on a month's trial. She likes to drop by the English classroom unannounced to check up on the progress of Mr Brown's students, and often leaves disappointed. She nearly eloped with a man in her early years, but was caught and sent home by her father. However, it was revealed that she was only six years old at the time and the "man" was eight. Her first name was mentioned only in the episode "Brief Re-Encounter". She has a Master of Arts from Oxford.
 Iris Sadler (20 episodes) as Gladys (Series 1–3), the tea lady in the school cafeteria, most often referred to as "Gladys the tea lady". She is a vivacious, friendly woman in her seventies. In Series 3, it is revealed that she is a widow. She has a friendly relationship with both Sidney and Mr Brown. She often cajoles Mr Brown and tattles on Miss Courtney.
 Tommy Godfrey (20 episodes) as Sidney (Series 1–3), the school caretaker, a rough, roguish Cockney in his sixties who speaks in rhyming slang. Only Miss Courtney calls him by his full name; everyone else calls him Sid. He dislikes his long-term partner and wears a black tie on their anniversary. Despite not being married, he routinely refers to her as his wife. He is hard of hearing, which often creates misunderstandings. He is very fond of alcohol and tricks the students into buying drinks for him and giving him money. He also steals supplies from the school and sells them. He is friendly with both Mr Brown and Gladys.
 Gabor Vernon (8 episodes) as Zoltan Szabo (Series 2), a Hungarian man from Budapest. He speaks almost no English, constantly saying "Bocsánat?" (Hungarian for "Excuse me?") and relying on his phrase book to help him communicate. Juan and Giovanni teach him many slang expressions, but he remains the worst speaker in the class. He has an English girlfriend in "All Present If Not Correct", but she beats him up after he gives her an insulting letter that Mr Brown had intended to deliver to Miss Courtney. He is fond of music and magic tricks, implying that he works as an entertainer, and returns to Hungary after Series 2 ends.

Series 4 only
 Sue Bond (13 episodes) as Rita, the new tea lady replacing Gladys.
 Marie-Elise Grepne (13 episodes) as Michelle Dumas, a student from France.
 Jenny Lee-Wright (13 episodes) as Maria Papandrious, a student from Greece and the sister of Maximillian Papandrious.
 Harry Littlewood (13 episodes) as Henshawe, the new caretaker of the school replacing Sid.
 Raj Patel (13 episodes) as Farrukh Azzam, a student from Pakistan.
 Vincent Wong (13 episodes) as Fu Wong Chang, a student from China.

Production

Development
The series was commissioned by Michael Grade, Director of Programmes at London Weekend Television. The majority of recordings for the first three series took place on Tuesday evenings in Studio Two at the South Bank Television Centre.

Using this series as an example, Sarita Malik, in Representing Black Britain (2002) wrote that "Blacks, Asians or 'race' were usually the butt of the joke", which "tended to hit a racist note, but always in a well-meaning, benevolent tone". She continued that "never before had so many diverse races... been seen in the same television frame, but they had never clung so tightly to their popular crude national stereotypes."

The series attracted about 18 million viewers. Grade cancelled the programme having considered the stereotyping offensive. "It was really irresponsible of us to put it out", he told Linda Agran at the Edinburgh Television Festival in 1985.

International screenings
The series continues to be screened internationally, particularly in the countries represented in the series onscreen. The series was sold to Pakistan, Australia, New Zealand, Sri Lanka, India, Malaysia, Kenya, Nigeria, Ghana, Singapore, Gulf states and Hong Kong. It was also one of the first British TV programmes shown in South Africa after the end of the boycott by the British Actors' Equity Association. It was also broadcast in Canada on CBC Television from 1978 until 1982. The series was screened by some minor or independent ABC TV stations in the United States during 1985.

Episodes

DVD releases
The series was released as a "Best of" four-disc box set on Region 2 DVD in 2003 (Cinema Club), and on Region 1 DVD in 2004 (Granada). However, these sets exclude the Series 1 episode "Kill or Cure", the Series 2 episode "Don't Forget the Driver", the Series 3 episode "Guilty or Not Guilty?" and all of Series 4.

Another four-DVD box set, The Complete LWT Series, released by Network in November 2007 contains all episodes of Series 1–3.

International remakes
International television shows based on the premise of Mind Your Language include:
 India: Zabaan Sambhalke and Zaban Sambhal Ke (in Hindi)
 Indonesia: Kelas Internasional (in Indonesian)
 Jordan: العلم نور (al-ʿilm nūr; in Arabic)
 Kenya: Classmates
 Malaysia: Cakap Melayu Lah (In Malay) and Oh My English! (in English)
 Malta: Klassi Għalina (in Maltese)
 Nigeria: Second Chance! (in English), and Jami'ar Albarkawa (in Hausa)
 Sri Lanka: Raja Kaduwa! (in Sinhala)
 United States: What a Country!

Criticism of racial stereotypes
David Aaronovitch notes that even Michael Grade, the commissioner of the series, regrets that Mind Your Language was ever broadcast:

References

External links

 
 
 

1977 British television series debuts
1986 British television series endings
1970s British sitcoms
1980s British sitcoms
British college television series
English-language television shows
ITV sitcoms
London Weekend Television shows
Television series about educators
Television series by ITV Studios
Television shows set in London
Sikhism in fiction